John Hyatt may refer to:

 John Hyatt (clergyman) (1767–1826), English Wesleyan clergyman
 John Wesley Hyatt (1837–1920), American inventor
 John Hyatt (musician), British musician

See also 
 John Hiatt (born 1952), American musician, singer and songwriter